East Lancaster Avenue Historic District is a national historic district located in Downingtown, Chester County, Pennsylvania. The district includes 121 contributing buildings and 1 contributing structure in Downingtown. The buildings include a number of notable examples of Georgian style dwellings dated to the early- to mid-18th century. Later notable dwellings are examples of the Federal and Victorian styles.  Located in the district and separately listed are the Downingtown Log House and General Washington Inn.

It was added to the National Register of Historic Places in 1979.

References

Historic districts on the National Register of Historic Places in Pennsylvania
Georgian architecture in Pennsylvania
Federal architecture in Pennsylvania
Victorian architecture in Pennsylvania
Historic districts in Chester County, Pennsylvania
National Register of Historic Places in Chester County, Pennsylvania
1979 establishments in Pennsylvania